Crassothonna is a genus of flowering plants belonging to the family Asteraceae.

Its native range is Southern Africa.

Species:

Crassothonna alba 
Crassothonna agaatbergensis 
Crassothonna cacalioides 
Crassothonna capensis 
Crassothonna clavifolia 
Crassothonna cylindrica 
Crassothonna discoidea 
Crassothonna floribunda 
Crassothonna opima 
Crassothonna patula 
Crassothonna protecta 
Crassothonna rechingeri 
Crassothonna sedifolia 
Crassothonna sparsiflora

References

Asteraceae
Asteraceae genera